The Panamint alligator lizard (Elgaria panamintina) is a species of lizard in the Anguidae family.

Distribution
They include the Panamint Range of Death Valley National Park, the Inyo Mountains, the White Mountains, and the Coso Mountains.

Description
They are 3⅝—6 inches (9.2—15.2 cm) long from snout to vent.  The tail length on this species is amazingly long—usually longer than the body.

This species is also known to be quite aggressive and bites when threatened.

References

External links
Californiaherps.com: Elgaria panamintina — Panamint Alligator Lizard
IUCN Red List of Threatened Species

Elgaria
Endemic fauna of California
Fauna of the Mojave Desert
Lizards of North America
Reptiles of the United States
Panamint Range
Inyo Mountains
White Mountains (California)
Reptiles described in 1958
Taxonomy articles created by Polbot